William John Bingham (August 8, 1889 – September 7, 1971) was an American college track and field athlete, coach, athletics administrator.  

Bingham attended Harvard University and set school records in track in the 440- and 880-yard runs.

After graduating from Harvard in 1916, Bingham moved to Texas, During World War I, he served in France with the American Field Service and later with the United States Army. He received the Croix de Guerre and attained the rank of captain.

After the war, he became the track coach at Harvard, a position he left in 1922 to work in the import business. In 1926, he was appointed as Harvard's first athletic director. He held that position for more than 25 years until 1951. He was forced out of the position in 1951 after the 1949 and 1950 Harvard Crimson football teams compiled records of 1–8 and 1–7.

Bingham also served from 1933 to 1950 on the NCAA's football rules committee, many of those years as the committee's chairman. He also served on the United States Olympic Committee's executive committee.

Bingham later served with the Central Intelligence Agency in Indonesia. After retiring, he lived in Virginia and later in Florida. He died on September 7, 1971, in Delray Beach, Florida.

References

1889 births
1972 deaths
American male middle-distance runners
American male sprinters
Harvard Crimson athletic directors
Harvard Crimson men's track and field athletes
Harvard Crimson track and field coaches
People of the Central Intelligence Agency
United States Army officers
United States Army personnel of World War I